François de La Vérendrye (1715 – 31 July 1794) was a Canadian explorer. He was the third son of Pierre Gaultier de Varennes, sieur de La Vérendrye. He was born at Sorel, New France in 1715 and was active in his father's trade activities from Fort Kaministiquia to the North Saskatchewan River.

In 1738, he was part of his father's expedition to Mandan country in what is now North Dakota. In 1739, he accompanied his brother, Louis-Joseph, and together they discovered the Saskatchewan River. In 1742–1743, he and his brother traveled southwest through Mandan territory, probably reaching Wyoming and viewing the Rocky Mountains. They were the first Europeans to cross the northern Great Plains and reach the mountains. Francois then returned east and served in the army during the Seven Years' War. He died on 31 July 1794, in Montreal.

He was one of two brothers to use the title "Chevalier" the other being Louis-Joseph. This causes some confusion when reading English translations of journals of the time. In 1762, he became known as the Sieur du Tremblay. With his death, the name La Vérendrye disappeared.

See also

 Sons of Pierre Gaultier de Varennes, sieur de La Vérendrye:
 Jean Baptiste de La Vérendrye (b. 1713)
 Pierre Gaultier de La Vérendrye (b. 1714)
 François de La Vérendrye (b. 1715)
 Louis-Joseph Gaultier de La Vérendrye (b. 1717)

References 
 Abbé I. Caron, Pierre Gaultier de Varennes de La Vérendrye et ses fils (Bull. rech. hist ., 1917) (translated)
 W. Stewart Wallace, ed., The Encyclopedia of Canada, Vol. IV, Toronto, University Associates of Canada, 1948

External links 
 
 

1715 births
1794 deaths
18th-century explorers
Explorers of Canada
Explorers of the United States
French explorers of North America
Canadian explorers
People of New France